Melvin Thompson (October 5, 1932 – February 5, 2009) was an American college basketball player and coach. He was the head coach at The Citadel from 1960 to 1967.

Born and raised in Richmond, Indiana, Thompson played college basketball for Everett Case at North Carolina State University. Following a semi-pro playing career, he was named an assistant coach at The Citadel in 1959, then assumed head coaching duties when Norm Sloan left for the University of Florida coaching job. In his seven seasons as head coach of the Bulldogs, Thompson compiled a record of 67–96. He was fired after an 8-17 season that would become the subject of author Pat Conroy's 2002 memoir My Losing Season, in which Conroy described Thompson as a mentally and emotionally abusive coach.

Thompson was named to the 1975 'Silver Anniversary Team' by the Indiana Basketball Hall of Fame in recognition of his basketball career. He died on February 5, 2009.

Head coaching record

References

External links
Coaching record at basketball-reference.com

1932 births
2009 deaths
American men's basketball players
Basketball coaches from Indiana
Basketball players from Indiana
Centers (basketball)
The Citadel Bulldogs basketball coaches
College men's basketball head coaches in the United States
NC State Wolfpack men's basketball players
Sportspeople from Richmond, Indiana